is a railway station in the city of Fukushima, Fukushima Prefecture, Japan operated by Fukushima Kōtsū.

Lines

Station layout

Sakuramizu Station has a single island platform with an underground walkway that connects the station to the platform—the only such walkway on the Iizaka Line. The ticket window is located on the first floor of the station. Commuter passes, ticket books, and connection tickets to the Abukuma Express Line are sold at the window. There is also a ticket vending machine. The Iizaka Line offices are located on the second floor. In addition, Sakuramizu serves as the Iizaka Line's rail yard, and as such has facilities for storage and maintenance for the line's fleet of Fukushima Transportation 7000 series trains.

Adjacent stations

History
Sakuramizu Station was opened on August 20, 1975.

Surrounding area
Fukushima Prefectural Route 3

See also
 List of railway stations in Japan

External links

   

Railway stations in Japan opened in 1975
Railway stations in Fukushima Prefecture
Fukushima Kōtsū Iizaka Line
Fukushima (city)